Asby is a civil parish in the Eden District, Cumbria, England. It contains 22 buildings that are recorded in the National Heritage List for England. Of these, one is listed at Grade I, the highest of the three grades, four are at Grade II*, the middle grade, and the others are at Grade II, the lowest grade.  The parish contains the small villages of Great Asby and Little Asby, and is otherwise almost completely rural.  Most of the listed buildings are houses and associated structures, farmhouses and farm buildings.  The other listed buildings comprise a church, a lych gate, almshouses, a roadbridge, a footbridge, and two wells.


Key

Buildings

References

Citations

Sources

Lists of listed buildings in Cumbria